Cuniptau Mines (a combination of the symbols Cu, Ni, Pt and Au) was a Canadian mining company from 1933 to 1937. It was incorporated in December 1933 under the leadership of B. W. Watkins with its headquarters based in Toronto, Ontario. The company was engaged in development of the Cuniptau Mine, a polymetallic ore deposit in Strathy Township of Northeastern Ontario. In later years Cuniptau Mines also acquired the Alexo Mine property in Clergue and Dundonald townships of Cochrane District.

History and operations
Development of the Cuniptau Mine began in 1933 with the sinking of a  shaft and underground drifting on the  shaft level. Operations in 1935 were confined mostly to surface mineral exploration. In 1936, the smelter was rebuilt to test out the possibilities of making a suitable matte from the mined ore. High-grade quartz vein material from the Cuniptau Silica Deposit in Best Township was used as flux for the ore smelting. Development of the Cuniptau Mine in 1936 consisted of underground drifting, crosscutting and raising, with exploration confined to surface and underground diamond drilling. The mine office was stationed at Goward, a locality now in the municipality of Temagami.

Cuniptau Mines reopened the Alexo Mine near Porquis Junction in 1936. Operations at this mining property during the year consisted of partial mine dewatering and sampling. The company shipped two cars of ore from Alexo to the Cuniptau Mine to increase the nickel content of the material being smelted.

On January 10, 1937, the shareholders of Cuniptau Mines ratified a proposal to merge the company with the newly formed Ontario Nickel Corporation. Ontario Nickel acquired the Cuniptau and Alexo mines in 1937 from this merge.

See also
List of mining companies
List of mines in Temagami

References

Defunct mining companies of Canada
Defunct companies of Ontario
Companies based in Toronto
Copper mining companies of Canada
Nickel mining companies of Canada
Gold mining companies of Canada
Platinum mining companies
Mining in Temagami